Stefan Šćepović (born 10 January 1990) is a Serbian footballer who plays as a striker for Brisbane Roar in the A-League.

Formerly an under-21 international, Šćepović made his senior debut for Serbia in 2012.

Club career

Early career
Šćepović started his professional career at OFK Beograd in 2007. In 2010, he left on loan to Sampdoria. As part of the agreement, Sampdoria have an option to sign him permanently at the end of the season. At the end of the season, Šćepović was linked to Juventus and Belgian Club Brugge, signing with the latter.

Club Brugge
In July 2010 Šćepović joined Belgian club Club Brugge. After suffering a goal drought in the first half of the season, he was loaned to Kortrijk in January 2011. Belgian media also described that he was most remembered in Brugge for accidentally locking himself in a bathroom in Affligem hours before a friendly.

Partizan
On 8 June 2012, Šćepović signed a two-year contract with FK Partizan.  On the same day, he married his longtime girlfriend Jovana Šćepović. He featured with Partizan in the 2012–13 UEFA Europa League and played against the likes of Internazionale, Rubin Kazan, and Neftchi Baku.

Sporting Gijón
In July 2013, Šćepović signed a three-year loan deal with Sporting de Gijón, with a buyout clause. In September he became the first player in the history of the club who managed to score in his first five consecutive games (against Real Madrid Castilla, Recreativo de Huelva, Mallorca, Ponferradina and Deportivo de La Coruña). This great performance was rewarded with the Segunda División Player of Month prize.

In January 2014 Šćepović was voted by the readers of Spanish sports newspaper Marca, best player of the first half of season, being referred as "the king of Segunda". Also, he was named in the campaign's midway best eleven, chosen by LFP.
 
On 6 February 2014 Šćepović was bought by Sporting outright for a €1 million fee, signing a contract until 2018. He scored 22 goals in 39 appearances for the club.

Celtic
On 2 September 2014, Šćepović signed a four-year deal with Celtic for £2.3 million, having turned down a move the day before. Eleven days later, he made his debut as a starter in a 2–1 victory against Aberdeen at Celtic Park.

On 23 October, he scored his first goal for the club against Astra Giurgiu in the UEFA Europa League, scoring a header from an Anthony Stokes free kick in a 2–1 home win. Three days later, he netted his second goal for the club and his first in the league, in a 2–0 victory over Kilmarnock. The other goal of that game was a free kick from John Guidetti, earned after Manuel Pascali was sent off for a professional foul on Šćepović.

On 15 March 2015, Šćepović was an unused substitute as Celtic won the Scottish League Cup with a 2–0 win over Dundee United in the final at Hampden Park, with Stokes and Leigh Griffiths starting and Guidetti as a substitute. On 24 May, he scored in each half as Celtic concluded their fourth consecutive league-winning season with a 5–0 home win over Inverness Caledonian Thistle.

Getafe
On 31 August 2015, Šćepović joined Spanish club Getafe on a season long loan. Scepovic scored his first goal for Getafe a diving header in the 1–0 win over Málaga.

On 28 June 2016, after suffering relegation, Šćepović signed a permanent contract with Geta. He helped the club in their immediate return to the top tier, notably scoring a brace against RCD Mallorca on 10 June 2017.

Sporting Gijón (loan)
On 12 July 2017 Šćepović returned to Sporting, after agreeing to a one-year loan deal. However, on 31 January 2018 and scoring four goals in 16 games played, Getafe and Sporting agreed to terminate the loan and was transferred to Hungarian club Videoton.

Brisbane Roar
On 7 February 2023, Šćepović signed for Australian club Brisbane Roar.

International career
Šćepović made his debut for the Serbia national football team on 29 February 2012 in a friendly match against Cyprus. He scored his first international goal on 15 October 2013 in a qualifier for the following year's World Cup against Macedonia at the Jagodina City Stadium; after replacing Filip Đorđević in the 62nd minute, he netted his team's last goal of a 5–1 victory eleven minutes later.

Career statistics

Club

Updated to games played as of 18 December 2018.

Personal life
He is the older brother of Marko Šćepović and the son of former Partizan striker and now one of the youth coaches, Slađan Šćepović.

Honours

Club
Celtic
Scottish Premiership (1): 2014–15
Scottish League Cup (1): 2014–15

Individual
Segunda División Player of the Month: September 2013

References

External links

1990 births
Living people
Footballers from Belgrade
Serbian footballers
Association football forwards
Serbia international footballers
Serbia under-21 international footballers
OFK Beograd players
FK Partizan players
U.C. Sampdoria players
Club Brugge KV players
K.V. Kortrijk players
F.C. Ashdod players
Hapoel Acre F.C. players
Sporting de Gijón players
Celtic F.C. players
Getafe CF footballers
Fehérvár FC players
Jagiellonia Białystok players
FC Machida Zelvia players
Málaga CF players
AEL Limassol players
Brisbane Roar FC players
Serbian SuperLiga players
Serie A players
Belgian Pro League players
Israeli Premier League players
Segunda División players
Scottish Professional Football League players
La Liga players
Nemzeti Bajnokság I players
J2 League players
Cypriot First Division players
Serbian expatriate footballers
Expatriate footballers in Italy
Expatriate footballers in Belgium
Expatriate footballers in Israel
Expatriate footballers in Poland
Expatriate footballers in Spain
Expatriate footballers in Scotland
Expatriate footballers in Hungary
Expatriate footballers in Japan
Expatriate footballers in Cyprus
Serbian expatriate sportspeople in Italy
Serbian expatriate sportspeople in Belgium
Serbian expatriate sportspeople in Israel
Serbian expatriate sportspeople in Spain
Serbian expatriate sportspeople in the United Kingdom
Serbian expatriate sportspeople in Hungary
Serbian expatriate sportspeople in Japan
Serbian expatriate sportspeople in Cyprus